Gordon Sidney Cowans (born 27 October 1958) is an English retired football player and coach.

Cowans started his career at Aston Villa as an apprentice in 1974, and signed as a professional in 1976. During his time at Aston Villa, he won the League Cup, the League Championship, the European Cup and the European Super Cup.

Cowans left Aston Villa for the first time in 1985, signing for Bari. He then returned to Aston Villa in 1988 and left again in 1991 moving to Blackburn Rovers. When he left Blackburn he went back to Aston Villa, before moving to Derby County, Wolverhampton Wanderers, Sheffield United, Bradford City, Stockport County and finally Burnley.

He was also capped 10 times by England at international level scoring two goals, against Scotland and Egypt. According to former Aston Villa team-mate Derek Mountfield, Cowans was the best two-footed player he ever played with, capable of tough tackling and making spectacular assists. Cowans is consistently rated by Villa fans as one of their 3 best ever players. Cowans returned once again to Aston Villa in a coaching role, first coaching in their youth academy before becoming first team coach and later reserve team manager.

Playing career

Aston Villa first spell
Although born in County Durham, Cowans came to Villa as an apprentice in 1973 at 15, and was part of the talented youth team that won the FA Youth Cup, an early indication of his talent. He soon made his first team debut, on 7 February 1976 as a substitute aged 17 whilst still an apprentice. At this time, he became a member of the England youth team. Progress continued and he was soon a regular in the Villa first team during the season Villa won the League Cup against Everton, and in 1979 he was voted PFA Young Player of the Year. In the 1980–81 season, Cowans won the league with Villa, and during the following season, the European Cup, on 26 May 1982. Cowans then broke his leg during a pre-season friendly in Spain and missed the whole 1983–84 season; upon regaining full fitness he was sold to Bari in 1985 for a fee of £250,000.

In his first spell at Villa he played 286 games scoring 42 goals. He also won the PFA young player of the year award, a league championship, a European Cup and a European Super Cup.

A.S. Bari
Over the course of three seasons in Italy, Cowans made 94 appearances for Bari, scoring three goals.

Aston Villa second spell
During Cowans' transfer to Bari, Villa had retained the option of first refusal to buy him back should Bari decide to sell him; in 1988, Graham Taylor took up this option – much to the pleasure of Villa supporters – and Villa went on to finish as runners-up in the league during the 1989/90 season, before Taylor left the club to manage England.

During his second spell at Aston Villa, Cowans made 117 appearances, scoring seven times.

Blackburn Rovers

Ron Atkinson sold Cowans on 28 November 1991 for £200,000 to Blackburn Rovers. He helped them gain promotion to the new FA Premier League as Second Division play-off winners at Wembley. In his time at Ewood Park he played 50 times, scoring twice.

Aston Villa third spell

He then signed on a free transfer back to Aston Villa on 5 July 1993. By the time he had left Villa for the last time he had played a total of 453 games scoring 49 goals.

Derby County

Cowans was transferred to Derby County on 3 February 1994 for £200,000. He played a total of 36 times scoring one goal.

Wolves
Cowans was transferred to Wolves on 19 December 1994 for £20,000. He made his debut on 26 December 1994 in a 4–1 defeat at Oldham Athletic aged 36. He went on to make 37 appearances for Wolves six of which were as a substitute.

Sheffield United

Cowans was one of the first signings that new Sheffield United boss Howard Kendall made after replacing Dave Bassett in late 1995. Cowans was a key part of the side as it rose clear from the relegation zone, and of the passing style that Kendall introduced to the club. He played in the FA Cup 3rd round replay win over Arsenal that set up a 4th round tie with his former team Aston Villa. Cowans played 21 times for Sheffield United, and was surprisingly not given an extended deal by Kendall, instead leaving the club in summer 1996.

Bradford City

Cowans was signed by Chris Kamara in 1996 for Bradford City following their promotion to Division One. He made a total of 25 league appearances (one as substitute) and two League Cup games, without scoring, before being given a free transfer to Stockport County in March 1997.

Stockport County

In his short time with Stockport Cowans made seven appearances, scoring no goals.

Everton

Cowans played six times for Everton, scoring no goals.

Coaching career
Cowans started his coaching career at Burnley before moving back to Villa Park for a fourth time to become youth team coach, then going on to become first team coach during Gérard Houllier's reign. With the departure of Houllier, the Villa hierarchy let it be known that both Cowans and Kevin MacDonald would have futures at the club no matter who the new manager was. In April 2014 Aston Villa suspended Ian Culverhouse, their assistant manager and Gary Karsa, the head of football operations pending an internal investigation. Cowans and veteran goalkeeper Shay Given were temporarily promoted in their place.

Honours
Aston Villa
 Football League First Division: 1980–81
 Football League Cup: 1976–77
 FA Charity Shield: 1981 (shared) 
 European Cup: 1981–82
 European Super Cup: 1982
 Intercontinental Cup runner-up: 1982

Individual
PFA Team of the Year: 1991–92 Second Division

External links

Player profile at Aston Villa Players Database

References

1958 births
Living people
Aston Villa F.C. players
S.S.C. Bari players
Blackburn Rovers F.C. players
Derby County F.C. players
Wolverhampton Wanderers F.C. players
Sheffield United F.C. players
Bradford City A.F.C. players
Stockport County F.C. players
Burnley F.C. players
Aston Villa F.C. non-playing staff
English footballers
England international footballers
England under-21 international footballers
England B international footballers
English expatriate footballers
Expatriate footballers in Italy
Serie A players
Serie B players
Premier League players
Burnley F.C. non-playing staff
Association football midfielders
English expatriate sportspeople in Italy